Greenidea artocarpi, also known as Greenidea (Greenidea) artocarpi, is an aphid in the superfamily Aphidoidea in the order Hemiptera. It is a true bug and sucks sap from plants.

References 

 http://animaldiversity.org/accounts/Greenidea_artocarpi/classification/
 http://www.nbair.res.in/Aphids/Greenidea-artocarpi.php
 http://aphid.speciesfile.org/Common/basic/Taxa.aspx?TaxonNameID=1162340

Greenideinae
Agricultural pest insects
Insects described in 1890